Brookbank is a surname. Notable people with the surname include:

Joseph Brookbank (born 1612), English cleric and schoolmaster
Kilee Brookbank (born 1998), American burn survivor and author
Sheldon Brookbank (born 1980), Canadian ice hockey player and coach
Wade Brookbank (born 1977), Canadian ice hockey player and scout